İmâdüddin Mustafa bin İbrâhim bin İnac al-Kırşehrî (1206-1326), often known as Sheikh Edebali, was an Ottoman Sunni Muslim Sheikh of the Ahi brotherhood, who helped shape and develop the policies of the growing Ottoman State. He became first Qadi of the Ottoman Empire. He was the father of Rabia Bala Hatun (wife of Osman Gazi, the founder of the Ottoman Empire).

Interaction with Ottoman leaders
Edebali often conversed with his close friend Ertuğrul Gazi, the father of Osman I about Islam and the state of affairs of Muslims in Anatolia. Osman had been a frequent guest of Edebali. Edebali became Osman's mentor and eventually girt him with a Gazi sword. Osman at Edebali's dergah, dreamed of a state. This dream thus led to the establishment of a state. After this, Edebali's daughter was married to Osman I. As a result of this marriage, all the Ahyan sheikhs came under the Ottoman control. This had a major impact on the establishment and development of the Ottoman Beylik.

Advice to Osman I

Edebali's advice to his son-in-law, Osman I, shaped and developed Ottoman administration and rule for six centuries.

In one famous declaration, Edebali told Osman:O my son!
Now you are king!

From now on, wrath is for us;
for you, calmness!

For us to be offended;
for you to please!

For us to accuse;
for you to endure!

For us, helplessness and error;
for you, tolerance!

For us, quarrel;
for you, justice!

For us, envy, rumor, slander;
for you, forgiveness!

O my son!

From now on, it is for us to divide;
for you to unite!

For us, sloth;
for you, warning and encouragement!

O my son!

Be patient, a flower does not bloom before its time.
Never forget: Let man flourish, and the state will also flourish!

O my son!

Your burden is heavy, your task hard, your power hangs on a hair!
May God be your helper!

In popular culture
Sheikh Edebali has been portrayed in the Turkish television series;  (1988), Diriliş: Ertuğrul (2014 - 2019) and Kuruluş: Osman (2019 - present).

See also 
Osman's Dream
Foundation of Ottoman Empire

External links

 Pictures of Bilecik and the Edebali lodge

References

1206 births
1326 deaths
Adnanites
13th-century Muslim scholars of Islam
13th-century people from the Ottoman Empire
Turkish centenarians
Men supercentenarians